Elachista albicapilla is a moth of the family Elachistidae. It is found in Italy and Austria.

albicapilla
Moths described in 1918
Moths of Europe
Taxa named by Gabriel Höfner